East End is one of the fourteen Districts of Anguilla.  Its population at the 2011 census was 671.

Education
There is one government school in the town, Morris Vanterpool Primary School. Albena Lake-Hodge Comprehensive School in The Valley serves secondary students.

Demographics

References

Populated places in Anguilla